Redwan Nawi
  Zamzuri Md Isa
  Hasmawi Hassan
  Mohd Bunyamin Umar
  Zairol Fitree Ishak
  K. Soley
  Megat Amir Faisal Al Khalidi Ibrahim
  Akmal Rizal Ahmad Rakhli
  Mohd Fauzi Nan
  Mohd Rafdi Abdul Rashid
  Shariman Che Omar
  Liew Kit Kong
  Ooi Hoe Guan
  Badrul Afzan Razali
  Redzuan Mohd Radzy
  Irwan Fadzli Idrus
  Danial Fadzly Abdullah
  Somchat Na Rong
  Manzoor Azwira Abdul Wahid
  Zainuddin Mohd Ariffin
  Amirul Nizam Mahadzir
  Tan Cheng Hoe
  Adrien Jurad Chamrong
  Cheah Kean Seng
  Roslan Abdul Rahim
  Mazlan Abdul Wahed
  G. Shanmugan
  Che Zambil Ahmad
  Yap Wai Loon
  Badulhisham Abdullah
  Khairul Anuar Baharum
  S. Ragesh
  Norizam Ali Hassan
  Mat Zahir Wahab
  Che Hisamuddin Hassan
  Maizal Hairi Marzuki
  Khattul Anuar Abdul Hamid
  Anuar Abdul Aziz
  Yew Choh Hooi
  Zulfatah Dzulkarnain
  Ahmad Zalghafari Manaf
  Amran Omar
  Azrin Shah Zainal
  Mohd Shawal Johadi
  Fakhzan Salleh
  Khamal Idris Ali
  Hashim Mustapha
  Muhamad Radhi Mat Din
  Manja Man
  Feriza Ismail
  Farouk Ismail
  Lee Thean Ewe
  Lim Teong Kim
  S. Thanasegar
  Lee Kin Hong
  Mohd Nidzam Adzha Yusoff
  Faridzuan Che Hamid
  Jelani Wilastra
  V. Thinagaran
  Ahmad Sabri Ismail
  Azmi Mahmud
  Ng Chew Beng
  Chan Keat Swee
  Mohamad Ramli
  Abdul Aziz Azizan
  Syed Alwi Syed Abdullah
  Romli Ghani
  Husin Jaafar
  Norazam Ishak
  K. Ravichandran
  Naina Mohamad
  Idris Man
  Hamizan Ishak
  Abdull Rahman Tasu
  Koet King Heong
  Karim Pin
  Faridzul Kassim
  Khor Sek Leng
  Mosthakeen Omar
  Syed Ahmad
  Roshidi Shaari
  Looi Loon Teik
  Yusof Bakar

See also
List of Kedah FA honours and achievements

Kedah Darul Aman F.C. players
Association football player non-biographical articles
Kedah